Guerrero is a metro station on the Mexico City Metro. It is located in the Colonia Guerrero neighborhood of Cuauhtémoc borough of Mexico City, on the intersection of Zarco street and Eje 1 Norte  Mosqueta Avenue. It is a transfer station for both Lines 3 and B.

General information
The station logo depicts the bust of Vicente Guerrero (1782-1831), a national hero who participated in the Mexican War of Independence. The name of this station refers to the neighbourhood which it serves.  The station was opened on 20 November 1970 with service along Line 3. Service along Line B started on 15 December 1999.

Guerrero has facilities for the handicapped and a cultural display.

Ridership

Exits

Line 3
East: Zarco street and Eje 1 Norte Mosqueta, Colonia Guerrero
West: Zarco street and Eje 1 Norte Mosqueta, Colonia Guerrero

Line B
Northeast: Eje 1 Norte Mosqueta and Héroes street, Colonia Guerrero
Southeast: Eje 1 Norte Mosqueta and Héroes street, Colonia Guerrero
Northwest: Eje 1 Norte Mosqueta and Guerrero street, Colonia Guerrero
Southwest: Eje 1 Norte Mosqueta and Guerrero street, Colonia Guerrero

Gallery

References

External links 

Guerrero
Railway stations opened in 1970
1970 establishments in Mexico
Railway stations opened in 1999
1999 establishments in Mexico
Mexico City Metro Line B stations
Mexico City Metro stations in Cuauhtémoc, Mexico City
Accessible Mexico City Metro stations